Vicente Julbe (c. 1800 – c. 1860) was Mayor of Ponce, Puerto Rico, from 1 October 1851 to 14 February 1854. He was a Spanish military officer with the rank of Coronel.

Mayoral term
Julbe is remembered for an edict he issued in October 1852. It stipulated that all homeowners were responsible for building a sidewalk in front of the houses.  The sidewalk was to be 45 inches wide, have an slight inclination towards the street for rain water runoff, and be made of bricks.

See also

 List of Puerto Ricans
 List of mayors of Ponce, Puerto Rico

Notes

References

Further reading
 Ramon Marin. Las Fiestas Populares de Ponce. Editorial Universidad de Puerto Rico. 1994.

External links
 Guardia Civil española (c. 1898) (Includes military ranks in 1880s Spanish Empire.)

Mayors of Ponce, Puerto Rico
1800s births
1860s deaths
Year of birth uncertain
Year of death uncertain